is a Japanese politician of the Democratic Party of Japan (DPJ), a member of the House of Councillors in the Diet (national legislature). A native of Tokyo and graduate of Waseda University, he was elected to the House of Representatives for the first time in 1993 as a member of Morihiro Hosokawa's Japan New Party. After losing his seat in 1996 as a member of the New Frontier Party, he was elected again in 2000 as a member of DPJ. In 2007, he was elected to the House of Councillors for the first time.

In 2012 Nagahama was appointed the Minister of the Environment

References

External links 
 Official website in Japanese.

1958 births
Living people
Waseda University alumni
Members of the House of Representatives (Japan)
Members of the House of Councillors (Japan)
Japan New Party politicians
New Frontier Party (Japan) politicians
20th-century Japanese politicians
Democratic Party of Japan politicians
Itochu people
21st-century Japanese politicians
Environment ministers of Japan